University Apartments may refer to:

University Apartments (Chicago, Illinois), listed on the National Register of Historic Places in Cook County, Illinois
University Apartments (Missoula, Montana), listed on the National Register of Historic Places in Missoula County, Montana
University Apartments (Amherst, Massachusetts), former apartments for the University of Massachusetts Amherst